Yu Nga Court is a Home Ownership Scheme court developed by the Hong Kong Housing Authority in Tung Chung, Lantau Island, New Territories, Hong Kong near Century Link, Bermuda Park, Yi Tung Park and Sheraton Hong Kong Tung Chung Hotel. The estate was constructed by Aggressive Construction Co. Ltd and consists of six residential blocks completed in 2021. It is the first public housing project in Hong Kong that has been affected by airport height restrictions since the closure of the Kai Tak Airport in 1998.

Politics
Yu Nga Court is located in Tung Chung North constituency of the Islands District Council. It is currently represented by Sammy Tsui Sang-hung, who was elected in the 2019 elections.

See also

Public housing estates on Lantau Island

References

Residential buildings completed in 2021
Home Ownership Scheme
Tung Chung